Patrick Henry "Pat" Martin (August 19, 1923 – April 21, 1987) was an American bobsledder who competed in the late 1940s and early 1950s. He was born and lived in Massena, New York, 80 miles north of Lake Placid.  Competing in two Winter Olympics, he won three medals with a gold (Four-man: 1948) and two silvers (Two-man and four-man: both 1952).

Martin also won five medals at the FIBT World Championships with two golds (Four-man: 1949, 1950) and three silvers (Two-man: 1950, 1951; Four-man: 1951).

References
Bobsleigh two-man Olympic medalists 1932-56 and since 1964 (sports123.com) 

1923 births
1987 deaths
American male bobsledders
Bobsledders at the 1948 Winter Olympics
Bobsledders at the 1952 Winter Olympics
Olympic gold medalists for the United States in bobsleigh
Olympic silver medalists for the United States in bobsleigh
Medalists at the 1948 Winter Olympics
Medalists at the 1952 Winter Olympics
People from Massena, New York